Higinio Vélez Carrión (July 27, 1947 – May 12, 2021) was a Cuban baseball manager.

Biography
After leading Santiago de Cuba to three straight championships in the Cuban National Series (1999–2001), he became the manager of the Cuba national baseball team, that would take home a gold medal from the 2004 Summer Olympics.

Velez died from COVID-19 on 12 May 2021, at age 73, in Havana during the COVID-19 pandemic in Cuba.

References

1947 births
2021 deaths
Olympic baseball managers
Deaths from the COVID-19 pandemic in Cuba